Land reforms were attempted in Sicily Since the 18th century. Their goal was to free the peasants from the bondages of feudalism, but currently they are regarded as one of the main causes for the rise of the Sicilian Mafia.

In the Kingdom of Sicily 
Under feudalism, the nobility owned most of the land. They enforced law and order through their private armies, which were also used to keep unruly workers and tenants in line.

In 1773, in the Palermo revolt, guilds (maestranza) urged peasants to apply for the nationalized lands of the Jesuits. in 1781-1786, Viceroy Caracciolo ruled that the fiefs of nobles now belong to the king. He also declared that private armies are illegal. Peasant obligations to lords were reduced.

In 1789, an edict called for enclosure of common lands, to be distributed to the poor in copyhold in exchange for yielding some of their feudal rights. However, most peasants were too poor to buy their rights, and the laws could be interpreted and enforced only by local magistrates. As a result, the rich became richer and the poor became poorer. A rural proletariat was created.

After 1812, the feudal barons steadily sold off or rented their lands to private citizens. Primogeniture was abolished, land could no longer be seized to settle debts, and one fifth of the land was to become private property of the peasants.

In the Kingdom of Italy 
In the 1860s, After Italy annexed Sicily in the Italian unification wars, it redistributed a large share of public and church land to private citizens.

Some scholars claim that the unification forces did not favor land reform, and with little benefit to them, the peasants rebelled. The insurrection was put down in 1865, killing 5000 peasants.

Other scholars claim that, on the contrary, the redistribution resulted in a huge boom in landowners: from 2,000 in 1812 to 20,000 by 1861.

With this increase in property owners and commerce came more disputes that needed settling, contracts that needed enforcing, transactions that needed oversight, and properties that needed protecting. The barons were releasing their private armies to let the state take over the job of enforcing the law, but the new authorities were not up to the task, largely due to their inexperience with capitalism. Lack of manpower was also a problem: there were often less than 350 active policemen for the entire island. Some towns did not have any permanent police force, only visited every few months by some troops to collect malcontents, leaving criminals to operate with impunity from the law in the interim. Compounding these problems was banditry: rising food prices, the loss of public and church lands, and the loss of feudal commons pushed many desperate peasants to steal. In the face of rising crime, booming commerce, and inefficient authorities, property owners turned to extralegal arbitrators and protectors.  These extralegal protectors would eventually organize themselves into the first Sicilian Mafia clans.

References 

Sicily
Sicily
Reform in Italy